Sergejs Pečura (born 14 June 1987) is Latvian professional ice hockey player, who currently plays for HK Dinaburga of the Latvian Hockey Higher League.

Pečura played four games in the Kontinental Hockey League for Dinamo Riga during the 2008–09 KHL season. He also had spells in Asia League Ice Hockey for Sakhalin Sea Lions and in the Ligue Magnus in France for Étoile Noire de Strasbourg. He also played for the Latvia men's national ice hockey team, playing in the 2010 and 2011 IIHF World Championship.

External links
 

1987 births
Living people
Étoile Noire de Strasbourg players
Kazzinc-Torpedo players
Krylya Sovetov Moscow players
Latvian ice hockey forwards
HK Liepājas Metalurgs players
HK Neman Grodno players
ASK/Ogre players
HK Riga 2000 players
Dinamo Riga players
Prizma Riga players
PSK Sakhalin players
Ice hockey people from Riga